Christopher Coleman (born 25 June 1968) is a British investment banker and corporate director. He is the Managing Director and Group Head of Banking of N M Rothschild & Sons. He is also the chairman of Randgold Resources.

Early life
Christopher Coleman was born on 25 June 1968 in London. He was the son of Anne Marie and John Coleman. He was educated at the Westminster School. He graduated from the London School of Economics, where he earned a BSc in Economics.

Career
Coleman began his career at N M Rothschild & Sons in 1989. Since 2015, he has served as Rothschild's Managing Director and Group Head of Banking.

Coleman served on the board of directors of MBCA Bank from 2001 to 2001. He has served on the board of Papa John's International since 2012. He was a non-executive director of Randgold Resources from 2008 to 2014, when he became its chairman.

Personal life
Coleman married Vivienne Lundgren in 1997. They have two sons.

References

Living people
1968 births
People educated at Westminster School, London
Alumni of the London School of Economics
English investment bankers
British corporate directors